The Bạch Đằng River, also called Bạch Đằng Giang (from ), white wisteria river, is a river in northern Vietnam, located near Hạ Long Bay. It flows through the Yên Hưng District of Quảng Ninh Province as well as the Thủy Nguyên District of Haiphong.

It is the best river way to access Ha Noi from the South of China, through the Nam Trieu gate, then Kinh Thầy River, Đuống River, and then Hong River to access Ha Noi.

The Bạch Đằng River has been the site of three important battles in Vietnamese history:
 938 where Ngô Quyền win against Southern Han attack, resulting in Vietnamese independence.
 981 where Lê Đại Hành win against Song Dynasty.
 1288, where General Trần Hưng Đạo employed tactics used in 938 to drive out Mongol invaders.

The Poles on Bạch Đằng River 
The poles on Bạch Đằng river was the remains of the three battles on the river, against the attacks toward Vietnam. The first event was in 938, base on Ngô Quyền battle strategy. As of now, four pole areas are found on the river.

It is unknown how these poles was set up. It is hypothesize that the poles were put down with the point edge face down, while using the weight of rocks to push the pole down, stablize it. Then, the edge on the other side, is sharpen right on the river.

Rivers of Thái Bình province
Rivers of Quảng Ninh province
Rivers of Haiphong
Rivers of Vietnam